What the Dickens is a television panel game hosted by Sandi Toksvig. Team captains were Dave Gorman and Tim Brooke-Taylor for the first series and Sue Perkins and Chris Addison for the second and third. It was recorded at Sky Studios in West London.

Transmissions

Rounds of the show

3 Steps to Heaven
Each team viewed up to three picture clues to help them identify a book, film, play, or musical from the world of fine arts and entertainment, scoring three points if they guessed the correct answer after just one picture clue, two after two, and one after all three were revealed.  If they failed to guess, the other side could guess for one point.

Love It or Loathe It
Each of the guests (or team captains at least once when a guest appeared twice) chose a subject from the world of arts and entertainment and had to present two arguments, one claiming they loved the subject and the other claiming they loathed it.  If the opposition could guess correctly whether the guest loved or loathed the subject, they scored two points.  If not, the guest making the arguments got two points.

Yes, and I'm Mickey Mouse
Played only in series 1 and 2.  The teams met members of the general public who coincidentally shared their names with characters from books, films, TV shows, plays, or musicals.  They had 90 seconds to ask yes or no questions to the mystery guest and then take a guess, for two points if guessed correctly.  If wrong, Sandi threw it over to the other side for one point.

Common People
Played only in Series 3, replacing Yes, and I'm Mickey Mouse.  The teams were shown three famous people and had to guess what all three had in common.

Losing the Plot
The final quickfire round.  Each team captain had 90 seconds to communicate the titles of books, films, plays, musicals, or TV shows, without using any proper names.  A common running gag in series 2 and 3 emerged when Sue Perkins pretended to get angry with her teammates when they had troubles guessing, leading her to continuously rant on and on, and in the process, saying the titles, and leaving no time for the other person to speak.  Nicholas Parsons was one teammate that had to sit and let her rant when she pretended to get angry, although he could only watch with a surprised look on his face.  Because of this running gag, Chris Addison won more games than Perkins in all cases where she ranted, though he didn't necessarily win more games overall.

Comedian Richard Herring (a teammate of Perkins) scored a record 10 points in this round, and Germaine Greer (a teammate of Addison's) had to humorously guess her own 1970 international best-selling book, The Female Eunuch.

Episodes
The coloured backgrounds denote the result of each of the shows:
 – indicates Tim's / Chris' team won.
 – indicates Dave's / Sue's team won.
 – indicates the game ended in a draw.

Series 1

Series 2

Series 3

External links
 What the Dickens at Sky Arts
 
 
 

2008 British television series debuts
2009 British television series endings
2000s British game shows
British panel games
Sky UK original programming